Corporal Andrew Bringle was an American soldier who fought in the American Civil War. Bringle received the country's highest award for bravery during combat, the Medal of Honor, for his action during the Battle of Sailor's Creek in Virginia on 6 April 1865. He was honored with the award on 3 July 1865.

Biography
Bringle's date of birth and death are unknown but he was born in Buffalo, New York. He enlisted into the 10th New York Cavalry.

Medal of Honor citation

See also

List of American Civil War Medal of Honor recipients: A–F

References

People of New York (state) in the American Civil War
Union Army officers
United States Army Medal of Honor recipients
American Civil War recipients of the Medal of Honor